The Cambridge Common Historic District is a historic district encompassing one of the oldest parts of Cambridge, Massachusetts.  It is centered on the Cambridge Common, which was a center of civic activity in Cambridge after its founding in 1631.  It was the site of the election for governor of the Massachusetts Bay Colony in 1636, and was a military barracks site during the American Revolutionary War.  The common was gradually reduced in size to its present roughly triangular shape, and surrounded by buildings in the 18th and 19th centuries.  In 1973 a historic district encompassing the extant common and everything within  of it was listed on the National Register of Historic Places.  In 1987 the district was amended to rationalize the boundary, which overlapped adjacent districts and included portions of some buildings.

The district now includes properties across Waterhouse Street to the west of the common, including the Christian Science Church, a Classical Revival structure, the brick apartment houses along and the 1753 Georgian Frost-Waterhouse House, the oldest building in the district.  To the north, across Massachusetts Avenue, the district includes Hemenway Gymnasium, Hastings Hall, Gannet House, and the Harvard-Epworth United Methodist Church.  On the south side, across Garden Street, lie the Old Burying Ground, The First Parish in Cambridge, Christ Church (a National Historic Landmark), and several houses.

The 1987 amendment to the district also added a small cluster of residential properties on Farwell Street, a dead-end street that is connected to the district by a footpath adjacent to the Old Burying Ground.  It represents a well-preserved collection of properties dating to the 18th and 19th centuries that harken back to the days when Harvard Square was primarily residential in character.

Notable interments 
 Cicely, Negro, slave of William Brattle

See also
National Register of Historic Places listings in Cambridge, Massachusetts
Common land

References

Harvard Square
Historic districts in Middlesex County, Massachusetts
National Register of Historic Places in Cambridge, Massachusetts
Historic districts on the National Register of Historic Places in Massachusetts